Tirant lo Blanch (modern spelling: Tirant lo Blanc) is a chivalric romance written by the Valencian knight Joanot Martorell, finished posthumously by his friend Martí Joan de Galba and published in the city of Valencia in 1490 as an incunabulum edition. The title means "Tirant the White" and is the name of the romance's main character who saves the Byzantine Empire.

It is one of the best known medieval works of literature in Valencian. It is considered a masterpiece in the Valencian literature and in the literature in Catalan language as a whole, and it played an important role in the evolution of the Western novel through its influence on the author Miguel de Cervantes. The book has been noted for its use of many Valencian proverbs.

Plot
Tirant lo Blanch tells the story of a knight Tirant from Brittany who has a series of adventures across Europe in his quest. He joins in knightly competitions in England and France until the Emperor of the Byzantine Empire asks him to help in the war against the Ottoman Turks, Islamic invaders threatening Constantinople, the capital and seat of the Empire. Tirant accepts and is made Megaduke of the Byzantine Empire and the captain of an army. He defeats the invaders and saves the Empire from destruction. Afterwards, he fights the Turks in many regions of the eastern Mediterranean and North Africa, but he dies just before he can marry the pretty heiress of the Byzantine Empire.

Themes
Compared to books of the same time period, it lacks the bucolic, platonic, and contemplative love commonly portrayed in the chivalric heroes. Instead the main character is full of life and sensuous love, sarcasm, and human feelings. The work is filled with down to earth descriptions of daily life, prosaic and even bitter in nature.

Influence
Tirant lo Blanch is one of the most important books written in Valencian. Written by Joanot Martorell in the 15th century, the Tirant is an unusual chivalric novel in its naturalistic and satirical character, which also appears to have a strong autobiographic component. It tells the feats and adventures of Knight Tirant lo Blanc from Brittany. At times, it parallels the life and adventures of Roger de Flor, main leader of the mercenary Company of Almogàvers, which fought in Asia Minor and Greece, both for and against the Emperor of Byzantium. This historical resemblance is evident in the description of events occurring around Constantinople and the defeat of Sultan Mehmed II "the conqueror". While Roger de Flor's almogàvers had the upper hand in the region, the Fall of Constantinople in 1453 was a huge shock to Christian Europe, marking an end to the Byzantine Empire that Martorell's contemporaries wished to change. In writing his novel, Martorell perhaps rewrote history to fit what he wanted it to be - which in a way makes it a precursor of the present-day genre of alternate history.

The Spanish text of Don Quixote states, in Chapter 6 of Part I, that because of certain characteristics of Tirant – characters with unlikely or funny names such as Kirieleison de Montalbán, the presence of a merry widow, the fact that in the book knights eat, sleep, and die in their beds having made a will, and the title can be understood as "Tirant the Blank", lacking a major victory to put on his shield – the book is quite different from the typical chivalric romance. These aspects make the book exceptional, and made Cervantes state that "por su estilo", which can be translated "because of its style" but more likely means "in its own way", the book is "a treasure of enjoyment and a gold mine of recreation" ("un tesoro de contento y una mina de pasatiempos"), the "best book in the world." It is an (unintentionally) funny book, and Cervantes liked funny books, believed the world needed more of them, and wrote his own in Don Quixote. Cervantes saw this 100-year-old book as the crown jewel of his library.

Translations and adaptations

Translations
The book has been translated into several languages including French, Italian, Spanish, Polish, Russian, Finnish, German, Dutch, Swedish and Chinese. Modern translations of the book into English include Tirant lo Blanc, translated by David H. Rosenthal (1983, 1996) and Tirant lo Blanc: The Complete Translation (Catalan Studies, Vol 1), translated by Ray La Fontaine (1994). There's also an adaptation in modern Catalan

Film adaptation
The plot of the 2006 film adaptation is based on the later part of the adventures of Tirant and events leading to his involvement in Constantinople and afterwards.

Notes and references

External links
 Full text in a slightly revised orthography version, in Catalan 
 Tirant lo Blanch, online edition (full text in a web page, in Catalan)
 edited and translated into English by Robert S. Rudder
Tirant lo Blanc: An Analysis of its Transitional Styles by Suzanne S. Hintz
Tirant lo Blanc, Wikisource
In the opinion of some experts Tirant is different from similar works see "Origenes de la novela..." By Marcelino Mendendez y Pelayo, Adolfo Bonilla y San Martin
 El ingenioso Hidalgo Don Quijote de la Mancha By Miguel de Cervantes Saavedra
 Tirant Lo Blanch: A Study of Its Authorship, Principal Sources and historical setting" by Joseph A. Vaeth (1918)

1490 books
Alternate history novels
Novels set in the Byzantine Empire
Catalan-language novels
Chivalry
Fictional knights
Incunabula
Medieval Catalan literature
Romance (genre)
Spanish novels adapted into films
Valencian literature